CECC may refer to:

Central Epidemic Command Center, government agency of Taiwan
Congressional-Executive Commission on China, independent agency of the United States government